The 1990 Marshall Thundering Herd football team was an American football team that represented Marshall University as a member of the Southern Conference (SoCon) during the 1990 NCAA Division I-AA football season.  Led by first-year head coach Jim Donnan, the Thundering Herd compiled an overall record of 6–5 with a mark of 4–3 in conference play, tying for fourth place in the SoCon. The team played home games at Fairfield Stadium in Huntington, West Virginia.

Schedule

References

Marshall
Marshall Thundering Herd football seasons
Marshall Thundering Herd football